Laozacla is a genus of crickets (Orthoptera: Ensifera) in the family Phalangopsidae, subfamily  Phalangopsinae, tribe Phalangopsini.  

The single (type) species Laozacla furca Gorochov, 2014 is recorded from pitfall traps in Champasak Province, Laos, after which the genus is named.

References

External links
 

Orthoptera of Indo-China
Ensifera genera
Crickets
Monotypic Orthoptera genera